Rik De Saedeleer (17 January 1924 – 3 March 2013) was a Belgian footballer, columnist and television sports commentator.

Playing career
De Saedeleer played the majority of his career at hometown club Racing Mechelen with whom he was runner-up in the 1951–52 Belgian First Division and was once called up for the Belgium national team for a 1949 friendly match against a squad made up of London-based professionals.

Media career
After retiring as a player, De Saedeleer wanted to be a football coach but instead became columnist at Het Laatste Nieuws and Belgium's best known football commentator, reporting from several World Cups. He was known for his emotional and humorous reports. He retired after the 1998 FIFA World Cup in France.

He died on 3 March 2013 after spending most of his final years in hospital. He was survived by his wife and two daughters.

Bibliography

References

External links
 Kort portret Rik De Saedeleer (bio) - Het Laatste Nieuws 

1924 births
2013 deaths
Sportspeople from Mechelen
Footballers from Antwerp Province
Association football midfielders
Belgian footballers
K.R.C. Mechelen players
Association football commentators
Belgian columnists
Belgian sports broadcasters